The Eisner Award for Best Lettering is an award for "creative achievement" in American comic books. It is awarded to a Letterer.

Winners and nominees

Multiple awards and nominations

The following individuals have won Best Letterer one or more times:

The following individuals have received two or more nominations but never won Best Letterer:

See also
 Eisner Award for Best Publication for Early Readers
 Eisner Award for Best Academic/Scholarly Work
 Eisner Award for Best Writer
 Eisner Award for Best Cover Artist
 Eisner Award for Best Coloring

References

Lettering
1993 establishments in the United States
Annual events in the United States
Awards established in 1993
Category